Clavulina alutaceosiccescens is a species of fungus in the family Clavulinaceae. It occurs in New Zealand. The fruit bodies resemble whitish clubs with one or two simple branches, and measure up to 28 mm tall by 2 mm wide. The roughly spherical to broadly egg-shaped spores are 8.3–9.4 by 6.8–8.3 μm.

References

Fungi described in 1988
Fungi of New Zealand
alutaceosiccescens
Taxa named by Ron Petersen